Mazaediothecium uniseptatum is a species of calicioid lichen in the family Pyrenulaceae. Found in French Guiana, it was formally described as a new species in 2015 by Dutch lichenologist André Aptroot. It has a dull, greyish-white thallus that lacks a cortex and is surrounded by a brown prothallus line. The apothecia are black but covered in their upper half with a golden yellow pruina; they are about 0.2 mm in diameter and up to 0.6 mm high. The asci soon disintegrate to form a mazaedium layer. Ascospores are pale grey with a shape ranging from ellipsoid to spindle-shaped (fusiform), and measure 7.0–12.0 by 5.0–7.5 μm; they contain a single septum. It is this last feature that is referenced in the species epithet uniseptatum.

References

Pyrenulales
Lichen species
Lichens described in 2015
Taxa named by André Aptroot
Lichens of South America